The Maïdo is a volcanic peak on the island of Réunion, located above the city of Saint Paul and overlooking the "Cirque de Mafate".

The road climbing from Saint Paul to  Maïdo goes through a forest of highland tamarin which is a popular area for family picnics.

Climatology 
An internationally renowned climatological station, the Maïdo atmospheric observatory, has been operating there since 2012. It depends on the Observatory of atmospheric physics in Reunion Island (OPAR), University of La Reunion.

References

External links 
 
 Aerial pictures of the Maïdo

Mountains of Réunion